Elections were held in 1999 for both Senators and Deputies to the States of Jersey.

Senator elections

 Stuart Syvret 15,212
 Christopher Lakeman 12,806
 Terry Le Sueur10,471
 Paul Le Claire 8,287
 Jean Le Maistre 7,796
 Ann Bailhache 7,295
 Jerry Dorey 6,529
 Roy Le Hérissier 5,206
 Derek Bernard 4,679
 John Rothwell 4,458
 Peter Walsh 4,082
 John de Carteret 3,834
 Shirley Baudains 3,715
 Anley Richardson 3,208
 Graeme Pitman 2,844
 George Thornhill 1,809
 Craig Leach 1,713
 Harry Cole 1,598
 Adrian Walton 1,527

Deputy Elections

St Helier Number One District

St Helier Number two district

St Helier Number three and four district
Philip Ozouf 1,618 votes
Ben Fox 1,395 votes
Jacqui Huet 1,380 votes
Shirley Baudains 786 votes
Graeme Rabet 763 votes
Robert Weston 734 votes
Michael Dun 490 votes
Eric Walker 354

St Saviour Number one district

St Saviour Number two district

St Saviour Number three district

St Brelade Number one district

St Brelade Number two district

St Clement

Grouville

St John

St Lawrence

St Martin

St Mary

St Ouen

St Peter

Trinity

References

General 1999
1999 elections in Europe
General election